The 1977–78 San Francisco Dons men's basketball team represented the University of San Francisco as a member of the West Coast Athletic Conference during the 1977–78 NCAA Division I men's basketball season. The Dons opened the season with a top 5 ranking, but played all but three weeks of the season outside the top ten. San Francisco finished the season with a 23–6 record (12–2 WCAC) and a No. 11 ranking in the final AP poll. As champions of the West Coast Athletic Conference, San Francisco played in the NCAA Tournament as No. 3Q seed (automatic qualifier) in the West region where they were upset in the regional semifinal by Cal State Fullerton.

Junior center Bill Cartwright was named conference Player of the Year for the second time.

Roster

Schedule and results

|-
!colspan=9 style=| Regular season

|-
!colspan=9 style=| NCAA Tournament

Rankings

Awards and honors
Bill Cartwright – WCAC Player of the Year (2x)

Team players drafted into the NBA

References

San Francisco
San Francisco Dons men's basketball seasons
San Francisco
San Francisco Dons
San Francisco Dons